The Ven. John Sanderson Long (21 July 1913 – 4 June 2008) was an Anglican priest.

Long was born into an ecclesiastical family and educated at St Edmund's School, Canterbury, Queens' College, Cambridge and Ripon College Cuddesdon. After a curacy at St Mary and St Eanswythe's Church, Folkestone he was a World War II chaplain in the Royal Naval Reserve.  He was domestic chaplain to the Geoffrey Fisher, the Archbishop of Canterbury, from 1946 to 1953. He then held incumbencies at Bearsted and Petersfield before becoming the Archdeacon of Ely in 1970. He retired in 1981.

References

1913 births

2008 deaths

People educated at St Edmund's School Canterbury

Alumni of Queens' College, Cambridge
Alumni of Ripon College Cuddesdon
Royal Naval Volunteer Reserve personnel of World War II
Archdeacons of Ely
Royal Navy chaplains
World War II chaplains
Royal Naval Reserve personnel